The  National Business and Technical Examinations Board popularly known as NABTEB, is a Nigerian examination board that is conducting examinations for technical and business innovation colleges in Nigeria. The National Business and Technical Examinations Board (NABTEB) was established under the Decree No. 70 (now Act 70) of the1993 constitution. The Decree (Act) mandated NABTEB with the responsibility to conduct Technical and Business Innovation certificate examinations hitherto being conducted by the West African Examinations Council (WAEC), London Royal Society of Arts, City and Guilds of London. It was established during the regime of Nigeria's former military Head of State, general Ibrahim Babangida. The NABTEB examinations are conducted biannually in May/June and November/December respectively.

History 
The National Business and Technical Examinations Board were established in 1992 to domesticate the examinations which were being conducted by the London Royal Society of Arts (RSA), City and Guild (C&G) of London and the West African Examinations Council's technical and business examinations in a bid to domesticate the examinations and tailor them towards the needs of the Nigerian society by the provisions of the National Policy on Education. The establishment of the board came as a result of over 15 years of battle for the establishment from 1977 to 1992 and four Government Panels was set up at different times to review the position and structure of public examinations in Nigeria's educational system. NABTEB was the first Federal organization to offer subsidized registrations to academic candidates in Nigeria.

Administration 
 
NABTEB is headed by a Chief Executive Registrar, Ifeoma Mercy Isiugo-Abanihe, she was appointed by president Muhammadu Buhari under section 9(1) of its establishing Act.

References

External links 
 
NABTEB examiners registration portal

Education in Nigeria
1992 establishments in Nigeria
Educational institutions established in 1992
Educational organizations based in Africa
Qualifications awarding bodies
School examinations
Secondary school qualifications